Damien Tibéri (born 23 August 1985 in Fréjus, Var) is a French former professional footballer who played as a left midfielder.

After playing for CS Sedan-Ardennes from 2006 to 2011, Tibéri joined AC Ajaccio in July 2011.

References

External links
 
 

1985 births
Living people
French people of Corsican descent
Sportspeople from Fréjus
French footballers
Footballers from Provence-Alpes-Côte d'Azur
Association football midfielders
Corsica international footballers
Ligue 1 players
Ligue 2 players
Championnat National players
CS Sedan Ardennes players
AC Ajaccio players
Stade Lavallois players
CA Bastia players
Grenoble Foot 38 players